The Australian freshwater limpet or Tasmanian freshwater limpet, scientific name Ancylastrum cumingianus, is a species of air-breathing freshwater snail or freshwater limpet, an aquatic pulmonate gastropod mollusc in the family Planorbidae. This species is endemic to freshwater lakes in the Central Plateau of Tasmania.

References

External links

Planorbidae
Critically endangered fauna of Australia
Taxonomy articles created by Polbot